Edward Thomas Dunn (January 15, 1920 – April 22, 2016) was an American football player and coach. He served as the head football coach at Springfield College in Springfield, Massachusetts from 1958 to 1975, compiling a record of 69–91–4.  He led Springfield to a perfect 8–0 season in 1965.

References

1920 births
2016 deaths
Colgate Raiders football players
Springfield Pride football coaches
People from Hamilton, New York